Holden High School may refer to:

Holden High School (California) in Orinda, California
Holden High School (Louisiana) in Holden, Louisiana
Holden High School (Missouri) in Holden, Missouri